Berhampore Court is a railway station on the Sealdah-Lalgola line and is located in Murshidabad district in the Indian state of West Bengal. It serves Baharampur and its census areas.

History

The Calcutta–Kusthia line of Eastern Bengal Railway was opened to traffic in 1862. The Ranaghat–Lalgola branch line was established in 1905 as an extension of Sealdah–Ranaghat line. This railway station was named Berhampore Court in accordance with the British pronunciation of Baharampore as "Berhampore".

Expansion/Electrification
Krishnanagar to Lalgola electrification and line doubling were completed in March, 2017.

Infrastructure

Important trains
 SDAH-LGL Bhagirathi Express
 KOAA-LGL Hazarduari Express
 KOAA-LGL Dhanodhanya Express

References

External links
 

Railway stations in Murshidabad district
Sealdah railway division
Kolkata Suburban Railway stations
Berhampore